is the second installment in the Super Sentai metaseries. It was aired from April 8, 1977 to December 23, 1977, replacing Himitsu Sentai Gorenger and was replaced by Battle Fever J. It was created by Shotaro Ishinomori, and was screened for 35 episodes. It marks the first appearance of a White Ranger in the franchise. Toei distributes the series internationally under the title The Jackers.

Plot
Iron Claw is the leader of a global criminal empire known as "Crime". Crime has a network of wealthy, influential sympathizers and employs an army of faceless, leather-masked thugs and cyborg assassins. It seeks to become the most powerful mafia organization in the world.

To combat the threat of Crime, ISSIS, the International Science Special Investigation Squad, is formed. The focus of the series is ISSIS's battles against Crime in Tokyo and Japan.

Tokyo's ISSIS branch commander, Daisuke Kujirai, proposes a radical experiment. Taking the code name "Joker", he recruits four young test subjects to undergo his cyborg enhancement project: Goro Sakurai, a  multi-talented athlete and Olympic Gold medalist; Ryu Higashi, a disgraced boxing champion; Karen Mizuki, a policewoman who has been critically injured; and Bunta Daichi, an oceanographer who is clinically dead and is being cryogenically sustained. All four are surgically altered and given various bionic enhancements as well as energy manipulation powers. They are given the code name J.A.K.Q. Dengekitai, or J.A.K.Q (pronounced "Jacker"), and the mission to destroy Crime. Later in the series Joker leaves to head ISSIS's advanced engineering branch, and Sokichi Banba, a master of disguise and a cyborg, becomes their new boss, known as Big One.

Characters

J.A.K.Q.

Goro Sakurai / Spade Ace 
 was a Japanese pentathlon athlete and Olympic Gold Medalist, a champion in karate, archery, and judo, a skilled equestrian, and a top all-around athlete. He initially turned down Joker's offer to join J.A.K.Q. but had a change of heart when he saves Karen Mizuki (later Heart Queen). Goro and Karen become romantically involved towards the end of the series.

Goro's bionic enhancements allow him to manipulate atomic energy in various ways. He can see through walls and other barriers using X-ray vision (his Chu Seishi [Neutron] Scope), move at super speed (using his Kosouku [Acceleration] Switch) and hear distant sounds (using his Enkaku Shuon Souchi [Ultra Sound Device]). As , colored red, he wields a number of specially designed weapons, particularly his  bow. With this bow, Goro is able to shoot "atomic charged" arrows that puncture and bore through most substances. The Spade Arts bow could also be converted into a whip for binding an opponent. Goro is also a powerful fighter.

Goro is a born leader and uses his abilities to seek out his enemies' weak points.

Goro appeared in the movie Hyakujuu Sentai Gaoranger vs. Super Sentai, a movie made to celebrate the 25th anniversary of the Super Sentai metaseries, leading 24 Red Rangers to help inspire the Gaoranger team.

Karen Mizuki / Heart Queen 
 is a Japanese-American female police detective who was assigned to investigate the routes used to traffic illegal narcotics into Japan. During one of her investigations she uncovered the fact that Crime controlled a majority of these routes, and decided to assist ISSIS in destroying them. Crime attempted to kill Karen by arranging a fatal car accident. Karen survived the accident but lost her right arm. Her father, a fellow police officer, was killed in the crash. Enraged and seeking revenge, Karen willingly accepted Joker's offer to undergo the bionic process and join J.A.K.Q.

Karen's bionic enhancements allow her to control magnetism. These powers allow her to attract and repel metallic objects at will, literally stopping bullets in mid-air. Her powers are further augmented by using her Q-shaped  weapon. Using the Heart Cute, Karen can send out waves of magnetic energy that can bowl over opponents or force them into erratic behaviors. She takes pleasure in this, asking afterward ). The Heart Cute can also be used as a blunt instrument to strike opponents. Her right index finger carries her "Magnetic Counter". This sends out a magnetic detection pulse, which she can then use to pinpoint and identify objects (both metal and organic) in a way similar to radar.

Karen is a skilled martial artist and is proficient in a number of fighting methods. She was temporarily part of the Kono Karate School where she befriended Natsuko Kono (Etsuko Shihomi), also a skilled martial artist. She has a flair for fashion and often sports tight red leather hotpants and long red boots. She falls in love with Goro towards the end of the series.

Ryu Higashi / Diamond Jack 
 was the former WBC welterweight boxing champion. He was falsely accused of murder by boxing promoters in Las Vegas when he refused to rig a championship fight. Joker intercepted him when he was being extradited to Japan for prosecution, and asked him to choose between working for ISSIS as part of J.A.K.Q. or serving his prison sentence. Ryu reluctantly accepted Joker's offer.

Ryu's bionic enhancements allow him to manipulate electric currents. His right index finger carries a powerful cutter (Eleki [Electric] Cutter), which he uses to cut through dense objects. His left ring finger carries a laser beam (Dia Laser) that shears through most materials. As , colored blue, Ryu wields the powerful , which he can imbue with his electrical powers to strike the enemy with deadly effect. The sword can slash and cut through solid steel and other dense metals. It can also be used to focus and fire electrical bolts of energy.

Ryu is a rough and gruff individual who is at times very headstrong and tends to prefer working alone. He continues to keep in touch with his former boxing partners, and loves jazz and fast cars.

Bunta Daichi / Clover King
 is an oceanographer who died of oxygen deprivation in a freak submarine accident. He lost his beloved younger sister Nami years earlier in an airplane crash. Bunta's body was cryogenically sustained in a medical facility for research until Joker found him. Using bionic technology, Joker revived Bunta as a cyborg.

Bunta's bionic enhancements allow him to manipulate gravitational forces. Bunta can gain superhuman strength by increasing his body weight and density. When his power is cycling in the range of 700 horsepower, he can use his "Juroku [Superpower] Energy" to punch and kick opponents with devastating effect. Bunta can throw opponents across great distances with his Juroku Nage (Power Throw) and can take down dozens of opponents with his  (a flying jump attack).

Sokichi Banba / Big One 
 is a cyborg, a flamboyant playboy, and a master of disguise. He helped Joker implement the J.A.K.Q. project and was called in to take over operations in Tokyo when Joker left. As , colored white, he is the ultimate "super cyborg" because his bionic implants allow him to harness and manipulate all four powers (atomic, magnetic, electric, and gravity).

Sokichi can use his powers to fly, and has superhuman strength and super speed. Sokichi is a cool-headed leader and masterful tactician who can come up with brilliant battle plans. He can transform into his cyborg persona at will without the use of the Kyouka Capsules: he takes a sniff of a magic red rose, then leaps up and transforms in mid-air.

Twenty-four years after the fall of Crime, Sokichi returned in Hyakujuu Sentai Gaoranger vs. Super Sentai as the leader of the "Dream Sentai" team.

Commander Daisuke Kujirai / Joker
, codenamed , is the recruiter of the J.A.K.Q team and their manager for most of the series. He is married and has a young daughter.

Crime
The global  is headed by the mysterious Iron Claw. It seeks to become the world's premier crime organization. In each episode of the series, Crime launches spectacular and elaborate schemes to loot, kill, plunder and obtain absolute power. It is later revealed that Crime is a cover organization for an alien entity called Shine, who sought to conquer the world.

Boss Iron Claw
 is the godfather of the Crime organization.  He is oddly dressed and nothing is known about him including his nationality. He appears human but was later revealed to be a cyborg like the members of J.A.K.Q.. His right hand is a powerful "Iron Claw", which fires talon-like missiles and can detach from Iron Claw's body to attack enemies independently. Iron Claw is a master of disguise, often masquerading as a female. He is a longtime rival of Big One, and the two of them have clashed at various times in the past.

Shine
 is revealed to be the real mastermind behind Crime towards the end of the series. A mysterious entity who is said to have come from the 2nd star of the "Shine" Galaxy, he attempted to use Crime to take over the Earth. He created the super cyborg  to take control of Crime from Iron Claw and to battle J.A.K.Q. In the final battle between the J.A.K.Q. and Crime, he was revealed to be an artificial intelligence and was driven out to space after Spade Ace and Heart Queen exposed his true identity.

Crimers
 are minions of the Crime organization. Their objective is to commit as many crimes as possible to advance Crime's goal of turning Japan into a crime-ridden nation. They wear dark purple masks and gray clothing and are armed with Sten Mark II submachine guns. Their distinct sound is "kwee".

Crime Big Four
The  are a quartet of ruthless mercenaries and despots who joined forces with Iron Claw to wreak havoc across the globe. Their headquarters is a gigantic UFO that can fly around the world undetected. They have battled with other heroes across the globe including Kikaider, Kamen Rider V3, and Kamen Rider Amazon.

Baron Iron Mask
 is a despot who terrorized the European continent. He leads the "Tetsu Men Gundan" (Iron Mask Battalion), his own specialized troopers. He carries a heavy iron shield and battle spear, which he can hurl with devastating skill, and also carries a blowgun, which he uses to fire poison darts.

General Sahara
 is an African conqueror who once battled the Gorengers in Africa with his Sahara Battalion. He is a master swordsman and strategist, and both ruthless and cruel in battle.

Captain UFO
 is a brilliant criminal mastermind who commands the UFO command ship that the Big Four use to travel the world.

Hell Boxer
 is a tyrant from Mongolia who uses his hideous skull-adorned armor to strike fear in his foes. He wields an iron ball and chain to crush and kill his opponents.

Episodes
Episodes aired on Saturdays at 7:30 PM JST.

Movie
 J.A.K.Q. Dengekitai (movie version of episode 7) (Release date January 26, 1979)

J.A.K.Q. vs. Gorenger
The movie  was released after the conclusion of the J.A.K.Q. Dengekitai series and featured a crossover between J.A.K.Q. and the Gorengers.

While investigating a UFO in the Sky Ace, J.A.K.Q. is caught off guard by the return of Iron Claw, with the Big Four now leading the remnants of Crime and the Black Cross Army. The next day, while arriving on the scene of a washed-up corpse, Heart Queen and Spade Ace encounter Peggy Matsuyama (Momo Ranger from the Gorengers), who has pursued the Sahara Army to Japan. After Matsuyama reveals markings on the murdered man's back, J.A.K.Q. learns of Crime's "Citybuster" project and the location of the syndicate's island base.

After infiltrating Crime's base, Spade Ace and Heart Queen learn of Iron Claw's plan to use the "Citybuster" bombs on the United States, the Soviet Union, China, France, the United Kingdom, West Germany and Japan, wiping out humanity while he and his forces retreat into space via a UFO before returning to Earth and conquering it. After saving Matsuyama, Spade Ace and Heart Queen escape the base but are surrounded by the Big Four and their armies. Clover King, Dia Jack and the rest of the Gorengers appear and save them. Together, the teams go on to defeat the Crime and Black Cross armies.

The Big Four combine to form the super cyborg "Big Four Robo", who overwhelms both teams until Big One arrives and J.A.K.Q. and the Gorengers combine their attacks to destroy it. Iron Claw then retreats to his UFO and begins to activate the "Citybuster" bombs until his UFO self-destructs, finishing him off for good. It turns out that Big One switched Iron Claw's hand with a remote controlled one that Spade Ace used to detonate the "Citybuster" bombs, destroying the craft and Iron Claw with it.

Cast
 Goro Sakurai / Spade Ace: Yoshitaka Tamba
 Karen Mizuki / Heart Queen: Mitchi Love
 Ryu Higashi / Diamond Jack: Shichiro Gou
 Bunta Daichi / Clover King: Yuusuke Kazato
 Sokichi Banba / The Big One / Joker II: Hiroshi Miyauchi
 Commander Daisuke Kujirai / Joker I: Daisuke Kujirai
 Iron Claw: Masashi Ishibashi
 Narrator: Toru Ohira

Guest Stars

Keiji Mizuki (Karen's father) (1): Jun Todo
Captain Robert (1): Ousmane Yusef
ISSIS soldiers (1): Jyunichi Haruta, Yutaro Osugi
Keiji (1)/Katsuya's brother (9): Toshimichi Takahashi 
Police officer (at airport) (1): Nenji Kobayashi
Crime Boss' Tokyo (1 & 2): Junji Masuda
Yamauchi (Ryu's boxing master) (2): Takeshi Omaeda
Sam (2): Jim Max Baden
Crime Boss' Yokohama (3 & 4): Yoshikazu Sugi
Hayato Kono (3): Kenji Ohba (credit as Kenji Takahashi)
Natsuki Kono (3): Etsuko Shihomi
Nami Daichi (Bunta's sister) (4): Terumi Sato
Emi Nishizaki (4): Takako Ishikawa
Emi's Father (4): Tsuyoshi Shintaku
Emi's Mother (4): Mari Nakamura
Crime Boss #3 (5): Kenji Ushio
Junko Koyama (5): Yōko Natsuki
Dr. Koyama (Junko's Father and Kujirai's teacher) (5): Hiroshi Katayama
Crime Boss Tomioka (6): Makoto Takagiri
Devil Amazon's Human Form (6): Rena Natsuki
Himself (7 & 14): Toru Kirikae 
Herself (7): Masako Kirikae
Crime Boss #5 (8): Fumitake Omura
Kumiko (Karen's closest friend) (8): Kyoko Okada
Kanako Mizuki (Butique's owner and Karen's mother) (8): Mieko Muramatsu
Katsuya Nakayama (9): Hiroyuki Sanada
Big Saturn (9): Willie Dorsey
Crime Boss #6 (9): Shinji Takano
Miki Ota (10): Megumi Shimizu
Henry Ota (10): Shuntaro Emi
Akao (10): Tomokazu Hokuto
Crime Boss #7 (10): Koji Miemachi
Wakamiya (11): Koki Tanioka
Crime Boss #8 (Dr. Fujita) (11): Takashi Toyama
Crime Boss #9 (12): Susumu Kurobe
Crime Boss #10 (Jan Muto) (13): Kazuo Arai
Ryuichi Iwasaki (13): Kenichi Mochizuki
Tamiko Hayashida (13): Eriko Hama
Reika (13): Keiko Shimizu
Bourne (14): David Friedman
Himself (14): Makoto Kaneko
Maya (14): Ritsuko Fujiyama
Crime Boss (008) (14): Eiichi Kikuchi
Crime Boss #11 (15): Chikako Susumu
Megumi (15): Yumi Tamai
Kenta (15): Fumihiko Ogawa
Sachiko Suzuki (15): Fumiyo Shigeno
Female Member nº 7 (15): Rumi Kudo
Crime Boss #12 (16): Nobuo Yana
Jiro Kanai (16): Hisashi Kubota
Misako Akizuki (17): Yuriko Izuka
Crime Boss #13 (Misako's Uncle) (17): Koji Kawamura
Ryoji Sada (18): Mutsumi Okabe
Ryochi Sada (Ryoji's Brother and Crime's Spy) (18): Koichi Okabe
Crime Boss #14 (18): Keisuke Nakai
Coronel Gamudi (20): Kentaro Kaji
Princess Cindy (20): Mayo Suzuki
Crime Boss #15 (20): Kin Oomae
Mr. Shin (22): Shin Misuta
Director Hosoda (Atomic Witch's human form) (23): Akiko Mori
Hiker (25): Eisuke Yoda
Fujita (27): Ken Sudo
Isamu Nishikawa (28): Kazuto Ando
Yukie Hamato (30): Sumiko Kakizaki
Director Hamato (30): Yoshio Yoshida
Shinta Yamamoto (31): Seiichi Ando
Shinta's father (31): Tsuyoshi Soma
Shinta's mother (31): Michiko Hoshi
Suikan (31): Akira Oizumi
Cooks (Admiral Buffalo's human form) (33): Tadashi Nakamura
Kujirai's wife (35): Isuzu Igarashi
Mari Kujirai (Kujirai's daughter) (35): Kumi Shimizu

Songs
Opening theme

Lyrics: Shotaro Ishinomori
Composition and arrangement: Michiaki Watanabe
Artist: Isao Sasaki with Koorogi '73

Ending theme

Lyrics: Saburō Yatsude
Composition and arrangement: Michiaki Watanabe
Artist: Isao Sasaki

References

External links
 Official J.A.K.Q. Dengekitai website 

1970s Japanese television series
1978 Japanese television series debuts
1978 Japanese television series endings
Cyborgs in television
Japanese crime television series
Shotaro Ishinomori
Super Sentai
TV Asahi original programming
Tokusatsu